The Castrocaro Music Festival, also known as Concorso per Voci Nuove, is an Italian musical contest which takes place every year in the town of Castrocaro Terme e Terra del Sole, near Forlì, from 1957. The competition is exclusively reserved for new talents, and it had its maximum popularity from 1962 to early Eighties when, under the direction of Gianni Ravera, based on an agreement with the Sanremo Music Festival the top two finishers of the competition gained the access to the Sanremo Festival. Singers who were launched by the event include Gigliola Cinquetti, Iva Zanicchi, Zucchero Fornaciari, Fiordaliso, Caterina Caselli, Laura Pausini, Eros Ramazzotti, Franco Simone and Alice.

References 

Music festivals in Italy
1957 establishments in Italy